American metalcore band Wage War has released four studio albums, one EP, eighteen singles, and sixteen music videos. The band self-released one EP, The Fall of Kings (2011). In 2015, the band signed to Fearless Records. The band released their first studio album, Blueprints, later in 2015 via Fearless. Their second studio album Deadweight was released under the same label in 2017. Their third studio album, Pressure, was released in 2019. Their fourth studio album, Manic, was released in 2021.

Studio albums

Extended plays

Singles

References

External links
 

Wage War discography at AllMusic
Wage War discography at Discogs
Wage War discography at MusicBrainz

Discographies of American artists
Heavy metal group discographies